J. A. Ewing may refer to:
 James Alfred Ewing (1855–1935), Scottish physicist and engineer
 James Arthur Ewing (born 1916), 40th Governor of American Samoa